Raluca is a common Romanian female given name, a Latinized diminutive of the Greek name Ralloú, a rare form of the Greek name Heracleia. It may refer to:

Raluca Băbăligea (born 1984), Romanian aerobic gymnast
Raluca Băcăoanu (born 1989), Romanian handballer
Raluca Haidu (born 1994), Romanian gymnast
Raluca Ioniță (born 1976), Romanian sprint canoeist
Raluca Izbașa, (born 1990), Romanian artistic gymnast
Raluca Olaru (born 1989), Romanian tennis player
Raluca Onel, (born 1982), Romanian artistic gymnast
Raluca Presadă, (born 1978), Romanian activist and politician 
Raluca Radulescu, professor of medieval literature
Raluca Ripan (1894–1972), Romanian chemist
Raluca Saita (born 1979), Romanian film editor
Raluca Sandu (born 1980), Romanian tennis player
Raluca Sârghe (born 1987), Romanian footballer
Raluca Sbîrcia (born 1989), Romanian épée fencer
Raluca Șerban (born 1997), Romanian tennis player
Raluca Strămăturaru (born 1985), Romanian luger
Raluca Turcan (born 1976), Romanian politician
Raluca Udroiu (born 1982), Romanian freestyle swimmer
Ralu Caragea (1799–1870), Romanian culture personality

Romanian feminine given names